Khanapur is a town in Belgaum district, Karnataka, India.

Khanapur may also refer to: 
Khanapur, Chevella mandal, village and panchayat in Ranga Reddy district, Telangana, India
Khanapur, Manchal mandal, village and panchayat in Ranga Reddy district, Telangana, India
Khanapur, Gokak taluk, village in Gokak taluk, Belagavi district, Karnataka, India
M.Khanapur, village in Belagavi district, Karnataka, India
U Khanapur, village in Belagavi district, Karnataka, India
Khanapur-M-Narendra, village in Dharwad district, Karnataka, India
Khanapur-M-Tadakod, village in Dharwad district, Karnataka, India
Khanapur (Vita), city and taluk in Sangli district, Maharashtra, India
Khanapur, Maharashtra Assembly constituency, India
Khanapur, Adilabad, mandal headquarters in Adilabad district, Telangana, India
Khanapur, Telangana Assembly constituency, India

See also
Khanpur (disambiguation)